Aramac  is a rural town and locality in the Barcaldine Region, Queensland, Australia.

Geography
The Muttaburra–Aramac Road enters from the north and exits as Barcaldine–Aramac Road to the south.

The predominant industry is grazing. The town water for Aramac is supplied from two bores connecting into the Great Artesian Basin.

History

Aramac lay on the traditional tribal lands of the Iningai. Iningai (also known as Yiningay, Muttaburra, Tateburra, Yinangay, Yinangi) is an Australian Aboriginal language spoken by the Iningai people. The Iningai language region includes the landscape within the local government boundaries of the Longreach Region and Barcaldine Region, particularly the towns of Longreach, Barcaldine, Muttaburra and Aramac as well as the properties of Bowen Downs and catchments of Cornish Creek and Alice River.

In the 1850s, pastoralist and future Premier of Queensland Robert Ramsey Mackenzie travelled through the area, which was on the traditional lands of the Iningai. He blazed a big tree with the inscription 'R R Mac', which was later corrupted into the name of the town. William Landsborough also explored the area in 1859. Pastoral occupation began in 1862 on the Bowen Downs station on Reedy Creek, north of Aramac, and the Aramac Station (1863).

In 1867, an employee of Aramac Station, John William Kingston, opened a bark-hut store at an outlying point on the Aramac Creek. Enlarged two years later to include a hotel (Kingston's Bazaar), Kingston's settlement was declared a town site in 1869 and surveyed as a town in 1875. It was the region's first town, and the centre of the first local-government division. To this day John William Kingston is recognised as the original founder of Aramac. His grave bears a plaque in the Aramac Cemetery acknowledging his achievement.

The town was originally called Marathon. The name was changed to that of Aramac, after the station, when the survey was conducted in 1875. Recollections of an 1878 visit to Aramac were published in the Rockhampton Morning Bulletin in 1933, describing the township as consisting of "neat weatherboard structures, painted, and comprising four stores, three hotels, and three butchers' shops, with a post office, bank, court house, and surgery", and the surrounding countryside and as  "one of the emporia of the West.""The place is known to so many by name only that the visitor feels himself travelled. Moreover, he has become, acquainted, however slightly, with the great western country, of which we have all heard so much. "He has been on its threshold, having traversed the desert, and beheld, not without surprise, broad rolling downs stretching away to the horizon, with an open landscape, sparsely mottled with trees, the whole presenting a vivid contrast to the dense scrub and scanty herbage of some of the more easterly districts. He has, in a word, seen an oasis in the 'Sahara' -one which, to him, has a beginning, but is boundless on the western side. Besides this, if the visit has been made during Show week, he has come more, fully to appreciate the great pastoral interest, as represented in the persons of men of intelligence and energy -the pioneers of colonisation, the promoters of commerce."Little is known about the original indigenous population, although there was a reported massacre of 25 local Aborigines at the nearby Mailman's Gorge. This event remained largely unknown until the publication of North Queensland Pioneers in 1932. The author stated:"The indigenous people were very numerous in the ranges around Aramac in the early days and the murder of a travelling jeweller and his wife and child caused reprisals. Harried by the police, the offending tribe took refuge in the country of a hostile tribe, and this precipitated wholesale tribal warfare. To this day it is said the mountain caves yield skeletons, the result of this tribal war."An 1865 account said the death of a shepherd or a government employee at Stainburn Downs station, north-west of Aramac, led to a revenge attack by squatters. Three Europeans are supposed to have tracked 30 Aborigines to a cave at Mailman's Gorge and shot them.

In 1870, Henry 'Harry' Redford duffed cattle from a property called Bowen Downs. He amassed a herd of about 1,000 cattle. Knowing that the Bowen Downs cattle brand would be recognised locally, Redford knew he could not sell them locally, so decided to drive the cattle overland to South Australia. This was a remarkable achievement of droving, but unfortunately for Redford, his herd included a prize white bull which was sufficiently unusual that it was recognised and Redford and his conspirators were arrested. Redford is believed to be the inspiration for the fictional bushranger Captain Starlight in the novel Robbery Under Arms.

Aramac Post Office opened on 1 March 1874.

Aramac State School opened on 21 January 1878. By 1901 the school was well established and received a very positive report from the School Inspector, Mr. Benbow, printed in The Western Champion."The discipline is kind, quietly firm, and sensible; the moral tone appears to be healthy; the school habits are very satisfactory; general behaviour is respectful and attentive; the class movements are quietly and effectively carried out, and very good order is maintained. Methods: The methods employed in teaching are generally intelligent and skillful; they are applied with skill and considerable energy; the amount of revision is sufficient. Progress: The progress made by the pupils may be regarded as good and sound. General condition: Everything considered the general condition of the school is highly satisfactory. Remarks: The two highest classes have been carefully and intelligently instructed, and the pupils of these classes have evidently been taught to think. The demeanor of the children during inspection was most pleasing."The hospital opened in 1879.

Circa 1888-1889 an Anglican church opened in Aramac.Aramac was initially a major outback town. However, when the Central Western railway line reached Barcaldine to the south in 1886, it drew trade away from Aramac. The residents agitated to get a railway connection to Aramac, but the Queensland Government was not willing. Having surveyed a route, in 1906, the Aramac Shire Council tried to borrow money from the Queensland Government to build their own railway. At that time, the Queensland Government was interested in creating a western connection between the Central Western railway line and the Great Northern railway and making that connection via Aramac was one possibility, but the government decided instead to build the connection between Longreach and Winton. The tramway opened on 2 July 1913 and operated until 31 December 1975. A tramway museum opened in 1994 in the old goods sheds.

St John's Catholic Church was opened circa 23 May 1901 by Bishop Joseph Higgins. In 1952, the old church was demolished to enable the construction of a new church, with services being held temporarily in the presbytery. On Sunday 14 December 1952, the new St John's Catholic Church was officially opened by Bishop Andrew Tynan.

In 1914, Aramac developed thermal baths with its artesian water to promote itself as a health resort; however, it did not attract many invalids due to its isolated geographic location and the failure of the local government to promote the baths.

The Aramac War Memorial was officially unveiled in April 1924, at a well attended public ceremony. The Last Post was played by Mr Affoo, and the children were all given a bag of lollies at the end of the ceremony. Shire Chairman, E.W. Bowyer presided and, as the Governor was unable to attend, gave the following speech:"This memorial was erected by the people of the Aramac Shire, as a modest tribute to the patriotism and loyalty of the men who enlisted to take part in the late deplorable European War. It will serve as an ineffaceable record to remind not only the rising generation but succeeding generations that Australians fought, bled, and died in the defence of their country."

In June 1924, a branch of the Country Women's Association was formed in Aramac, and by August that year were active, their efforts much appreciated in the town, and reported in the Western Champion: "Something new in entertainments was provided on Friday evening at the Shire Bail, when the Aramac branch of the Country Women's Association arranged a Euchre and Ping Pong tournament for us, with dance thrown in."

In the  Aramac had a population of 299 people.

On 22 November 2019, the Queensland Government decided to amalgamate the localities in the Barcaldine Region, resulting in five expanded localities based on the larger towns: Alpha, Aramac, Barcaldine, Jericho and Muttaburra. Aramac was expanded to incorporate Cornish Creek (eastern part), Dunrobin (south-western corner), Galilee, Garfield (western corner), Ibis, Ingberry (northern part), Pelican Creek, Sardine (eastern part), Upland, and Upper Cornish Creek.

Heritage listings 
Aramac has a number of heritage-listed sites, including:
 Boundary Street: Aramac Tramway Museum
 Lodge Street: Aramac War Memorial
 69 Porter Street: Aramac State School

Education 

Aramac State School is a government primary and secondary (Early Childhood-10) school for boys and girls at 69 Porter Street. In 2017, the school had an enrolment of 56 students with 10 teachers (9 full-time equivalent) and 10 non-teaching staff (6 full-time equivalent). In 2018, the school had an enrolment of 55 students with 10 teachers (9 full-time equivalent) and 12 non-teaching staff (6 full-time equivalent).

The closest secondary school for students from Years 11 and 12 is Barcaldine Prep-12 State School,  to the south in Barcaldine.

Facilities 

Aramac has a visitor information centre, swimming pool located within the grounds of the Aramac Memorial Park in Gordon Street, a town hall, showground and a pub. There is no hospital, but nurse-led clinic facilities (Monday to Friday), ambulance services and 24-hours a day, seven days a week emergency on-call services. In 2016 the community had access to two doctors, with one staying overnight for two full days each week. The town is also serviced by the Royal Flying Doctor Service.

Barcaldine Regional Council operates the Ollie Landers Community Library at 68 Gordon Street.

Events 
The annual Harry Redford Cattle Drive begins in Aramac and partly traces the 1870 footsteps of renowned cattle duffer Harry Redford who walked 1,000 head of cattle from Bowen Downs, north of Aramac, to South Australia. In 2015 and 2016 the drive was cancelled due to prolonged drought in the region.

Nearby cattle and sheep stations
Aramac Station
Bowen Downs Station
It was returned to the traditional owners, the Iningai people, in 2019, and will be renamed Turraburra. Much work on restoring the land and waterways has been done, and  it is being opened to visitors. Cliffs on the property are covered with ancient rock art, including paintings and etchings of megafauna, emu symbols and the traditional songline of the Seven Sisters. Planning for an educational centre created from local rock is under way.

See also

 Aramac Airport
 Aramac Station
 Lake Galilee (Queensland)
 List of tramways in Queensland

References

External links

 
 Town map of Aramac, 1980
 Aramac Shire Council
 Australian Places - Aramac

Towns in Queensland
Populated places established in 1869
Barcaldine Region
1869 establishments in Australia
 
Hot springs of Australia
Localities in Queensland